This list of Thomist writers runs from the 13th to the 18th century, stopping short of neo-Thomism. It includes writers who engaged with the thought of Thomas Aquinas, but might not strictly be considered Thomist thinkers.

Source: The Catholic Encyclopedia of 1913, article Thomism. The listing is chronological, by date of death.

Thirteenth century 

 Thomas de Cantimpré
 Hugh of St Cher
 Vincent of Beauvais
 St Raymond de Pennafort
 Peter of Tarentaise (Pope)
 Giles de Lassines
 Reginald de Piperno
 William de Moerbeka
 Raymond Marti
 Bernard de Trilia
 Bernard of Hotun, Bishop of Dublin
 Dietrich of Apolda
 Thomas of Sutton

Fourteenth century 

 Peter of Auvergne
 Nicholas Boccasini, Benedict XI
 Godfrey of Fontaines
 Walter of Winterburn
 Ægidius Colonna
 William of Paris
 Gerard of Bologna
 four biographers
 Peter Calo
 William de Tocco
 Bartolommeo of Lucca
 Bernard Guidonis
 Dante
 Natalis Hervieus
 Petrus de Palude
 Thomas Bradwardin
 Robert Holkott
 John Tauler
 Henry Suso
 Thomas of Strasburg
 Jacobus Passavante
 Nicholas Roselli
 Durandus of Aurillac
 John Bromyard
 Nicholas Eymeric

Fifteenth century 
 Manuel Calecas
 St Vincent Ferrer
 John Dominici
 John Gerson
 Luis of Valladolid
 Raymond Sabunde
 John Nieder
 Dominic of Flanders
 John de Montenegro
 Fra Angelico
 Antoninus of Florence
 Nicholas of Cusa
 John of Torquemada
 Bessarion
 Alanus de Rupe
 Johann Faber
 Petrus Niger
 Peter of Bergamo
 Jerome Savonarola

Sixteenth century 

 Felix Faber
 Vincent Bandelli
 John Tetzel
 Diego de Deza
 Sylvester Mazzolini
 Francesco Silvestro di Ferrara
 Thomas de Vio Cajetan
 Conrad Koellin
 Chrysostom Javelli
 Santes Pagnino
 Francisco de Vitoria
 Franc Romseus
 Ambrosius Catherinus
 Lancelot Politi
 St Ignatius of Loyola
 Matthew Ory
 Dominic Soto
 Melchior Cano
 Ambrose Pelargus
 Peter Soto
 Sixtus of Siena
 Johann Faber
 St Pius V
 Bartholomew Medina
 Vincent Justiniani
 Maldonatus
 Juan Maldonado
 St Charles Borromeo
 Louis of Granada
 Bartholomew of Braga
 Toletus (Francisco de Toledo), cardinal
 Peter Canisius
 Thomas Stapleton, Doctor of Louvain
 Molina

Seventeenth century 

 Domingo Báñez
 Bart Ledesma
 Baronius
 Capponi a Porrecta
 Aur Menochio
 Petr Ledesma
 Francisco Suárez
 Du Perron, cardinal
 Robert Bellarmine
 Francis de Sales
 Hieronymus Medices
 Lessius
 Martin Becanus (Martin Verbeeck)
 Malvenda
 Thomas de Lemos
 Alvarez
 Paul Laymann
 Joann Wiggers
 Nicholas Riccardi
 Dominic Gravina
 John of St Thomas
 Juan Martínez de Ripalda
 Francis Sylvius, Du Bois
 Petavius
 Goar
 Giovanni Stefano Menochio
 Franc Pignatelli
 De Lugo
 Bollandus
 Jammy
 Thomas de Vallgornera
 Philippe Labbe
 Pallavicini
 Busenbaum
 Jean Nicolaï
 Vincent Contenson
 Jac Pignatelli
 Vicente Ferre (d. 1682)
 Passerini
 Jean Baptiste Gonet
 Louis Bancel
 Louis Thomassin
 Goudin
 Sfrondati
 Quétif
 Rocaberti
 Casanate

Eighteenth century 

 Jacques-Casimir Guerinois
 Bossuet
 Norisius, OSA
 Thyrsus González
 Antoine Massoulié
 Du hamel
 Wigandt
 Piny
 Lacroix
 Carrières
 Natalis Alexander
 Jacques Échard
 Livarius de Meyer
 Benedict XIII
 Th du Jardin
 Hyacintha Serry
 Duplessis d'Argentré (Charles du Plessis d'Argentré)
 Vincent Louis Gotti
 Milante
 Preingue
 Concina
 Charles René Billuart
 Benedict XIV
 Cuiliati
 Giovanni Vincenzo Patuzzi
 De Rubeis
 Touron
 Thomas de Burgo
 Gener
 Alphonsus Liguori
 Mamachi
 Pietro Maria Gazzaniga (1722–1799)

See also 
 List of Catholic philosophers and theologians
 List of Jesuit theologians

References 

Attribution

Thomist

Lists of Roman Catholics
Thomist